The 1970 South African Grand Prix, formally titled the Fourth AA Grand Prix of South Africa (Afrikaans: Vierde AA Suid-Afrikaanse Grand Prix), was a Formula One motor race held at Kyalami Circuit on 7 March 1970. It was race 1 of 13 in both the 1970 World Championship of Drivers and the 1970 International Cup for Formula One Manufacturers. It was also the 14th and last Formula One victory for triple world champion Jack Brabham.

Two time World Champion and five time Monaco Grand Prix winner Graham Hill, driving a Lotus 49C for Rob Walker, made his return to racing after a life-threatening crash in the 1969 United States Grand Prix. Despite extensive knee surgery that left Hill with minimal mobility, he finished sixth. Hill rated this achievement as among his finest. After the race, he could not get out of the car by himself and had to be lifted out.

Qualifying

Qualifying classification

Classification

Championship standings after the race

Drivers' Championship standings

Constructors' Championship standings

Note: Only the top five positions are included for both sets of standings.

References

External links

South African Grand Prix
Grand Prix
South African Grand Prix
March 1970 sports events in Africa